Saint Barthélemy is an island in the French West Indies.

Saint-Barthélemy may also refer to:
 Saint-Barthélemy, Quebec, a municipality in Canada
 Saint-Barthélemy, Switzerland, a municipality in the canton of Vaud, Switzerland

In France:
 Saint-Barthélemy, Isère, in the Isère département
 Saint-Barthélemy, Landes, in the Landes département
 Saint-Barthélemy, Manche, in the Manche département
 Saint-Barthélemy, Morbihan, in the Morbihan département
 Saint-Barthélemy, Haute-Saône, in the Haute-Saône département
 Saint-Barthélemy, Seine-et-Marne, in the Seine-et-Marne département
 Saint-Barthélemy-d'Agenais, in the Lot-et-Garonne département
 Saint-Barthélemy-d'Anjou, in the Maine-et-Loire département
 Saint-Barthélemy-de-Bellegarde, in the Dordogne département
 Saint-Barthélemy-de-Bussière, in the Dordogne département
 Saint-Barthélemy-de-Séchilienne, in the Isère département
 Saint-Barthélemy-de-Vals, in the Drôme département
 Saint-Barthélemy-Grozon, in the Ardèche département
 Saint-Barthélemy-le-Meil, in the Ardèche département
 Saint-Barthélemy-le-Plain, in the Ardèche département
 Saint-Barthélemy-Lestra, in the Loire département
 Saint-Barthelemy, in the Bouches-du-Rhône département A northern suburb of Marseille

See also
St. Bartholomew's (disambiguation)

References